The San Bartolomé mine is one of the largest silver mines in Bolivia and in the world. The mine is located in the south of the country in Potosí Department. The mine has estimated reserves of 153 million oz of silver.

References 

Silver mines in Bolivia
Mines in Potosí Department